Srđan Blažić (Cyrillic: Срђан Блажић; born 26 November 1982) is a Montenegrin retired football goalkeeper.

Club career
In January 2010, Standard Liège officials struck a deal with Montenegrin goalkeeper, who left Greek club Levadiakos on a free transfer at the end of the season. He signed at Panetolikos in August 2011

Anorthosis / Nea Salamina
On 29 May 2012, he signed a two-year contract with Anorthosis Famagusta FC On January he was given on loan to Nea Salamis Famagusta FC.

On 2 July 2013, Blažić contract with Anorthosis was mutually terminated.

International career
Blažić made his debut for Montenegro in a November 2009 friendly match against Belarus and has earned a total of 2 caps, scoring no goals. His second and final international was a November 2010 friendly against Azerbaijan.

Honours
Standard Liège
Belgian Cup: 2010–11

References

External links
 Profile & Statistics at Guardian's Stats Centre
 
 Srđan Blažić at Footballdatabase

1982 births
Living people
Footballers from Podgorica
Association football goalkeepers
Serbia and Montenegro footballers
Montenegrin footballers
Montenegro international footballers
FK Zeta players
FK Budućnost Podgorica players
FK Mornar players
FK Kom players
FK Zora players
FK Rudar Pljevlja players
Levadiakos F.C. players
Standard Liège players
Panetolikos F.C. players
Anorthosis Famagusta F.C. players
Nea Salamis Famagusta FC players
PAS Lamia 1964 players
AO Chania F.C. players
FK Iskra Danilovgrad players
First League of Serbia and Montenegro players
Second League of Serbia and Montenegro players
Montenegrin First League players
Super League Greece players
Belgian Pro League players
Cypriot First Division players
Football League (Greece) players
Montenegrin expatriate footballers
Expatriate footballers in Greece
Montenegrin expatriate sportspeople in Greece
Expatriate footballers in Belgium
Montenegrin expatriate sportspeople in Belgium
Expatriate footballers in Cyprus
Montenegrin expatriate sportspeople in Cyprus